Juan Arañés (died c. 1649) was a Spanish baroque composer. His tonos and villancicos follow the style of those preserved in the Cancionero of Kraków.

Biography 
Arañés was born in Aragon, at an unknown date.  After studies in Alcalá de Henares, he was maestro di cappella at the Spanish embassy in Rome, where in 1624 he published his Libro Segundo de tonos y villancicos. The first book is lost.<ref>Diccionario de la música y los músicos: Vl.1 p70 ed. Mariano Pérez Gutiérrez - 1985</ref> The Libro Segundo collection contains 12 pieces of 1, 2, and 3 voices, tonos humanos and villancicos, the final being a vocal chaconne for 4 voices, A la vida bona which features in the works of Miguel de Cervantes. The collection is notable for its guitar accompaniment in Italian notation.Ramón Menéndez Pidal, José María Jover Zamora -Historia de España: El Siglo del Quijote (1580-1680) Las letras,Vol 2 p26  1987 "El Libro segundo de Tonos y villancicos a 1, 2, 3 y 4 voces con la cifra de la guitarra española a la usanza romana (Roma, 1624) de Juan Arañes ofrece el interés de la inserción del acompañamiento instrumental; "  He died in or after 1649.

Works, editions and recordingsA la vida bona for 4 voices - on (i) Musica en el Quijote y otras obras de Miguel de Cervantes, Orphénica Lyra (Glossa, 2005) and (ii) Miguel de Cervantes, Don Quijote de la Mancha: Romances y Músicas'' dir. Jordi Savall, Hesperion XXI, (Alia Vox, 2006).
Nuevo Sarao performed his works at the Festival de Música Antiga dels Pirineus in 2011 and recorded his complete works.

References

Spanish Baroque composers
16th-century births
1649 deaths
Spanish male classical composers
Year of birth unknown
17th-century classical composers
17th-century male musicians